St Johns Church, is an Anglican church in Launceston, Tasmania and the oldest church in the city having started construction in 1824. Though the church is one of the oldest surviving churches in Australia, it has received numerous extensions and modifications with only the tower and first window pair of the nave being original. St John's Church is located on the corner of St John Street and Elizabeth Street and is one of five churches facing onto Prince's Square.

The church's bell was cast by Whitechapel Bell Foundry in London.

See also
 Anglican Church of Australia

References

External links

 St John's Anglican Church website

1824 establishments in Australia
Churches in Launceston, Tasmania
Anglican churches in Tasmania
Churches completed in 1825
Gothic Revival church buildings in Australia
Tasmanian Heritage Register